Toronto USC Tridents (Ukrainian Sports Club Tridents) is a Canadian soccer team based in Toronto. The club was founded by Ukrainians that had been settled in Toronto after the second world war.

History
The club has had a very storied history, considering it was formed by the Ukrainian diaspora group. The team played in the National Soccer League until 1960, at which time it ceased playing in the league.

Year-by-year

Notable players
 Aleksandar Arangelovic
 Walter Bobinec
 Michel Campo
 Jack McKinnon
 Frank Pike
 Ted Virba
 Juan Warecki
 Ostap Steckiw

References 
Notes

External links
 Українська футбольна діаспора
 Кленовый лист на вышиванке
 Canadian Soccer League

Canadian National Soccer League teams
Ukr
Ukrainian association football clubs outside Ukraine
Ukrainian-Canadian culture in Ontario
Ukrainian diaspora in Canada